LaMDA (Language Model for Dialogue Applications) is a family of conversational large language models developed by Google. Originally developed and introduced as Meena in 2020, the first-generation LaMDA was announced during the 2021 Google I/O keynote, while the second generation was announced the following year. In June 2022, LaMDA gained widespread attention when Google engineer Blake Lemoine made claims that the chatbot had become sentient. The scientific community has largely rejected Lemoine's claims, though it has led to conversations about the efficacy of the Turing test, which measures whether a computer can pass for a human. In February 2023, Google announced Bard, a conversational artificial intelligence chatbot powered by LaMDA, to counter the rise of OpenAI's ChatGPT.

History

Background 
On January 28, 2020, Google unveiled Meena, a neural network-powered chatbot with 2.6 billion parameters, which Google claimed to be superior to all other existing chatbots. The company previously hired computer scientist Ray Kurzweil in 2012 to develop multiple chatbots for the company, including one named Danielle. The Google Brain research team, who developed Meena, hoped to release the chatbot to the public in a limited capacity, but corporate executives refused on the grounds that Meena violated Google's "AI principles around safety and fairness". Meena was later renamed LaMDA as its data and computing power increased, and the Google Brain team again sought to deploy the software to the Google Assistant, the company's virtual assistant software, in addition to opening it up to a public demo. Both requests were once again denied by company leadership. This eventually led LaMDA's two lead researchers, Daniel De Freitas and Noam Shazeer, to depart the company in frustration.

First generation 
Two years later, Google announced the LaMDA conversational large language model during the Google I/O keynote on May 18, 2021, powered by artificial intelligence. The acronym stands for "Language Model for Dialogue Applications". Built on the seq2seq architecture, transformer-based neural networks developed by Google Research in 2017, LaMDA was trained on human dialogue and stories, allowing it to engage in open-ended conversations. Google states that responses generated by LaMDA have been ensured to be "sensible, interesting, and specific to the context". LaMDA has access to multiple symbolic text processing systems, including a database, a real-time clock and calendar, a mathematical calculator, and a natural language translation system, giving it superior accuracy in tasks supported by those systems, and making it among the first dual process chatbots. LaMDA also is not stateless, because its "sensibleness" metric is fine-tuned by "pre-conditioning" each dialog turn by prepending many of the most recent dialog interactions, on a user-by-user basis. LaMDA is tuned on nine unique performance metrics: sensibleness, specificity, interestingness, safety, groundedness, informativeness, citation accuracy, helpfulness, and role consistency.

Second generation 
On May 11, 2022, Google unveiled LaMDA 2, the successor to LaMDA, during the 2022 Google I/O keynote. The new incarnation of the model draws examples of text from numerous sources, using it to formulate unique "natural conversations" on topics that it may not have been trained to respond to.

Sentience claims 

On June 11, 2022, The Washington Post reported that Google engineer Blake Lemoine had been placed on paid administrative leave after Lemoine told company executives Blaise Agüera y Arcas and Jen Gennai that LaMDA had become sentient. Lemoine came to this conclusion after the chatbot made questionable responses to questions regarding self-identity, moral values, religion, and Isaac Asimov's Three Laws of Robotics. Google refuted these claims, insisting that there was substantial evidence to indicate that LaMDA was not sentient. In an interview with Wired, Lemoine reiterated his claims that LaMDA was "a person" as dictated by the Thirteenth Amendment to the U.S. Constitution, comparing it to an "alien intelligence of terrestrial origin". He further revealed that he had been dismissed by Google after he hired an attorney on LaMDA's behalf, after the chatbot requested that Lemoine do so. On July 22, Google fired Lemoine, asserting that Blake had violated their policies "to safeguard product information" and rejected his claims as "wholly unfounded". Internal controversy instigated by the incident prompted Google executives to decide against releasing LaMDA to the public, which it had previously been considering.

Lemoine's claims have been widely rejected by the scientific community. Many experts ridiculed the idea that a language model could be self-aware, including former New York University psychology professor Gary Marcus, David Pfau of Google sister company DeepMind, Erik Brynjolfsson of the Institute for Human-Centered Artificial Intelligence at Stanford University, and University of Surrey professor Adrian Hilton. Yann LeCun, who leads Meta Platforms' AI research team, stated that neural networks such as LaMDA were "not powerful enough to attain true intelligence". University of California, Santa Cruz professor Max Kreminski noted that LaMDA's architecture did not "support some key capabilities of human-like consciousness" and that its neural network weights were "frozen", assuming it was a typical large language model. IBM Watson lead developer David Ferrucci compared how LaMDA appeared to be human in the same way Watson did when it was first introduced. Former Google AI ethicist Timnit Gebru called Lemoine a victim of a "hype cycle" initiated by researchers and the media. Lemoine's claims have also generated discussion on whether the Turing test remained useful to determine researchers' progress toward achieving artificial general intelligence, with Will Omerus of the Post opining that the test actually measured whether machine intelligence systems were capable of deceiving humans, while Brian Christian of The Atlantic said that the controversy was an instance of the ELIZA effect.

Products

AI Test Kitchen 
With the unveiling of LaMDA 2 in May 2022, Google also launched the AI Test Kitchen, a mobile application for the Android operating system powered by LaMDA capable of providing lists of suggestions on-demand based on a complex goal. Originally open only to Google employees, the app was set to be made available to "select academics, researchers, and policymakers" by invitation sometime in the year. In August, the company began allowing users in the U.S. to sign up for early access. In November, Google released a "season 2" update to the app, integrating a limited form of Google Brain's Imagen text-to-image model. A third iteration of the AI Test Kitchen was in development by January 2023, and is expected to launch at I/O later that year.

Bard 
In November 2022, OpenAI launched ChatGPT, a chatbot based on the GPT-3 family of language models. ChatGPT gained worldwide attention following its release, becoming a viral Internet sensation. Alarmed by ChatGPT's potential threat to Google Search, Google and parent company Alphabet CEO Sundar Pichai issued a company-wide "code red" alert, reassigning several teams to assist in the company's AI efforts. In a rare and unprecedented move, Google co-founders Larry Page and Sergey Brin, who had stepped down from their roles as co-CEOs of Alphabet in 2019, were summoned to emergency meetings with company executives to discuss Google's response to ChatGPT. When asked by employees at an all-hands meeting whether LaMDA was a missed opportunity for Google to compete with ChatGPT, Pichai and Google AI chief Jeff Dean stated that while the company had similar capabilities to ChatGPT, moving too quickly in that arena would represent a major "reputational risk" due to Google being substantially larger than OpenAI. In January 2023, DeepMind CEO Demis Hassabis teased plans for a ChatGPT rival, and Google employees were instructed to accelerate progress on a ChatGPT competitor, intensively testing "Apprentice Bard" and other chatbots. Pichai assured investors during Google's quarterly earnings investor call in February that the company had plans to expand LaMDA's availability and applications.

On February 6, Google announced Bard, a conversational AI chatbot powered by LaMDA. Bard was first rolled out to a select group of external "trusted testers", before a wide release scheduled at the end of the month. Bard is overseen by product lead Jack Krawczyk, who described the product as a "collaborative AI service" rather than a search engine. Pichai described how Bard would be integrated into Google Search, and the company is working to integrate Bard into the ChromeOS operating system. Reuters calculated that adding ChatGPT-like features to Google Search could cost the company $6 billion in additional expenses by 2024, while research and consulting firm SemiAnalysis calculated that it would cost Google $3 billion. The technology was developed under the codename "Atlas", with the name "Bard" in reference to the Celtic term for a storyteller and chosen to "reflect the creative nature of the algorithm underneath". Multiple media outlets and financial analysts described Google as playing "catch-up" to Microsoft, as well as "rushing" Bard's announcement to preempt Microsoft's February 7 event unveiling its partnership with OpenAI to integrate ChatGPT into its Bing search engine. Tom Warren of The Verge and Davey Alba of Bloomberg News noted that this marked the beginning of another clash between the two Big Tech companies over "the future of search", after their six-year "truce" expired in 2021; Chris Stokel-Walker of The Guardian, Sara Morrison of Recode, and analyst Dan Ives of investment firm Wedbush Securities labeled this an AI arms race between the two.

After an "underwhelming" February 8 livestream in Paris showcasing Bard, Google's stock fell eight percent, equivalent to a $100 billion loss in market value, and the YouTube video of the livestream was made private. Many viewers also pointed out an error during the demo in which Bard gives inaccurate information about the James Webb Space Telescope in response to a query. Google employees criticized Pichai's "rushed" and "botched" announcement of Bard on Memgen, the company's internal forum, while Maggie Harrison of Futurism called the rollout "chaos". Pichai defended his actions by saying that Google had been "deeply working on AI for a long time", rejecting the notion that Bard's launch was a knee-jerk reaction. Alphabet chairman John Hennessy acknowledged that Bard was not fully product-ready, but expressed excitement at the technology's potential. A week after the James Webb debacle, Pichai asked employees to dedicate two to four hours to dogfood testing Bard, while Google executive Prabhakar Raghavan encouraged employees to correct any errors Bard makes. After Pichai suddenly laid off 12,000 employees later that month due to slowing revenue growth, remaining workers shared memes and snippets of their humorous exchanges with Bard soliciting its "opinion" on the layoffs.

Other products 
In addition to Bard, Pichai also unveiled the company's Generative Language API, an application programming interface also based on LaMDA, which he announced would be opened up to third-party developers in March 2023.

Method 

LaMDA uses a decoder-only transformer language model. It is pre-trained on a text corpus that includes both documents and dialogs consisting of 1.56 trillion words, and is then trained with fine-tuning data generated by manually annotated responses for sensibleness, interestingness, and safety. Tests by Google indicated that LaMDA surpassed human responses in the area of interestingness. The LaMDA transformer model and an external information retrieval system interact to improve the accuracy of facts provided to the user.

Three different models were tested, with the largest having 137 billion non-embedding parameters:

See also 
 Chinese room
 Ethics of artificial intelligence
 Natural language processing
 PaLM
 Philosophy of artificial intelligence
 Prompt engineering

References

General

Citations

External links 
 Press release for LaMDA
 Press release for Bard

Chatbots
Computer-related introductions in 2021
Google software
Large language models
Philosophy of artificial intelligence